Abbasabad (also Romanized as ‘Abbāsābād; also known as ‘Abbāsābād-e Rāmjerd and Abbas Abad Ramjerd) is a village in Majdabad Rural District, in the Central District of Marvdasht County, Fars Province, Iran. At the 2006 census, its population was 505, in 110 families.

References 

Populated places in Marvdasht County